The Lakeport Carnegie Library is a Carnegie library located near the shore of Clear Lake in Lakeport, California.

Completed in 1918 in the Classical Revival type of architecture, it had been given an $8000 grant for its construction after local organizations like the Ladies' Improvement Club lobbied philanthropist Andrew Carnegie. The plans were drawn by Ward and Blohme and it was built by Hinds and Randolph. By December 1920 there were 4793 books in the library. In 1985 the library outgrew the building and moved to another location. The building was temporarily vacant, but now houses scientists from UC Davis who are conducting research on Clear Lake.

References

Carnegie libraries in California
Lakeport, California
Buildings and structures in Lake County, California
History of Lake County, California
Library buildings completed in 1918
Libraries on the National Register of Historic Places in California
Neoclassical architecture in California
National Register of Historic Places in Lake County, California
1918 establishments in California